Mucilaginibacter soyangensis is a non-motile bacterium from the genus of Mucilaginibacter which has been isolated from the Lake Soyang in Korea.

References

External links
Type strain of Mucilaginibacter soyangensis at BacDive -  the Bacterial Diversity Metadatabase

Sphingobacteriia
Bacteria described in 2014